American rapper Angel Haze has released one studio album, one internet album, two extended plays (EPs), four mixtapes and nineteen singles (including four as a featured artist and nine promotional singles). In July 2012, after releasing two prior mixtapes, Haze released a mixtape Reservation online for free. The title is inspired by the act of reserving a table at a restaurant, saying "[...] For me, it's like that with the rap industry. I made my reservation there [...] and now I'm finally arriving". The lead single "New York" peaked at number 58 on the UK Singles Chart, and number 12 on the UK R&B Singles Chart. Shortly after, Haze released a commercial EP compiled of tracks from Reservation, titled New York, followed by a fourth mixtape, Classick. Throughout late 2013, during the run-up to the release of the debut album, Haze released a cover of a popular song every day, for thirty days. Most famous from these freestyles was the adaptation of Macklemore and Ryan Lewis's track "Same Love", which discusses childhood, prejudice, homophobia and sexuality. The series was dubbed 30 Gold.

In late 2013, Haze leaked their debut album Dirty Gold after a disagreement with the record label, who wanted to put out the album sometime in early 2014. Due to Haze's leaking of the project, their label quickly released the album, and it was officially distributed to online retailers on December 30, 2013. It was a commercial failure, with reports claiming that the album may have sold as few as 850 copies in its debut week. Dirty Gold was preceded by the single "Echelon (It's My Way)" and spawned the single "Battle Cry" which featured Australian singer Sia. The latter of the singles achieved minor success in the UK, peaking at number 70 on the UK Singles Chart, and 12 on the UK R&B Singles Chart.

In February 2015, after a year of touring, two promotional singles were released to promote Haze's upcoming projects, titled "CANDLXS" and "GXMES". On September 14, 2015, Haze released a project titled Back to the Woods which was described as "something to share before [the] sophomore".

Albums

Studio albums

EPs

Mixtapes

Singles

As lead artist

As featured artist

Promotional singles

Other charted songs

Other releases

30 Gold

Guest appearances

References

Discographies of American artists
Hip hop discographies